The Cross Country 144 Hole Weathervane was a golf tournament on the LPGA Tour from 1950 to 1953. The tournament consisted of four 36-hole legs played over several weeks. Each leg was also considered an official LPGA event.

Winners
1953

1952

1951

1950

Notes and references

Former LPGA Tour events
Golf tournaments in the United States
1950 establishments in California
1953 disestablishments in the United States
Recurring sporting events established in 1950
Recurring sporting events disestablished in 1953